John Greaves Clapham (ca. 1796 – 1854 or later) was a businessman and political figure in Lower Canada and Canada East.

Clapham was a merchant at Quebec City. In 1816, he married Helena, the daughter of  judge Henry Black. Clapham was elected to the Legislative Assembly of Lower Canada for Mégantic in 1834. He served as lieutenant with the Queen's Volunteers during the Lower Canada Rebellion. In 1851, he was elected to the Legislative Assembly of the Province of Canada for Mégantic.

He died in or some time after 1854.

External links

Members of the Legislative Assembly of Lower Canada
Members of the Legislative Assembly of the Province of Canada from Canada East
Year of birth uncertain
1790s births
1854 deaths